is a Japanese former swimmer who competed in the 2000 Summer Olympics.

References

1979 births
Living people
Japanese male butterfly swimmers
Olympic swimmers of Japan
Swimmers at the 2000 Summer Olympics
Universiade medalists in swimming
Swimmers at the 1998 Asian Games
Universiade bronze medalists for Japan
Asian Games competitors for Japan
Medalists at the 2001 Summer Universiade
21st-century Japanese people